USS Niagara may refer to:

, was a brig launched in 1813, and served as Oliver Hazard Perry's flagship during the Battle of Lake Erie.
, was a Civil War-era steam frigate launched in 1855 and sold in 1885
, was a steamer, built in 1877, and acquired by the US Navy in 1898 for service in the Spanish–American War and sold in 1899
A submarine tender named Niagara was laid down in 1911 but renamed  prior to completion
, was a motor boat built in 1913 and acquired by the US Navy for World War I in 1917, and served until 1919
, was a yacht built in 1915 and acquired by the US Navy in 1917 serving until 1922. She was later transferred to the US Coast Guard, reclassified as a USLHT, and renamed Poinsettia.
, was a yacht, built in 1898 and acquired by the US Navy in 1917 and converted into an armed patrol yacht. She was reclassified PY-9 in 1920, and finally struck from the Naval Vessel Register in 1931.
, was a yacht built in 1929 as Hi-Esmaro. Acquired by the Navy in 1940 and sunk in battle on 22 May 1943
, was an amphibious assault ship which served from 1945 to 1950

United States Navy ship names